The music for the MMORPG Final Fantasy XIV was composed by Nobuo Uematsu, a regular contributor to the music of the Final Fantasy series. Several other composers including Masayoshi Soken and Naoshi Mizuta contributed music for updates to the game. The music for the game's reboot, Final Fantasy XIV: A Realm Reborn, and subsequent expansions, is compiled of a collection of original and remixed songs by numerous composers, namely Uematsu, Soken, as well as others including guest composers such as Okabe of the NIER series. Soken was the sound director for both releases of the game. Music from both releases of the game has been released in several albums. A pair of mini-albums containing a handful of selected tracks from XIV, Final Fantasy XIV: Battle Tracks and Final Fantasy XIV: Field Tracks, were released by Square Enix in 2010 when XIV first launched. A soundtrack album titled Final Fantasy XIV - Eorzean Frontiers, containing most of the music that had been released by that point for XIV, was digitally released in 2012. A final soundtrack album for the original release of the game, Before Meteor: Final Fantasy XIV Original Soundtrack, was released in 2013 just before the launch of A Realm Reborn, and contains all of the music that was composed for XIV throughout its lifetime. The latest soundtrack album, Shadowbringers: Final Fantasy XIV Original Soundtrack, was released in 2019. This album contains the music for the third expansion, Shadowbringers, and music from the previous expansion, Stormblood, that was added to the game via patches after the release of that expansion's soundtrack.

The soundtracks for both releases of the game were well received by critics. Uematsu's mix of orchestral and rock tracks for XIV were praised, though the delayed release of a full album drew criticism. Soken's work on A Realm Reborn, including both his original tracks as well as themes carried over from XIV and previous Final Fantasy games, were heavily praised by reviewers for the game. Music from the initial release of the game has been played in the international Distant Worlds Final Fantasy concert series, and books of sheet music for piano arrangements of music from the game have been produced.

Creation and influence

The massively multiplayer online role-playing game (MMORPG) Final Fantasy XIV was released in two versions: the original (live between 2010 and 2012), and its remake (Final Fantasy XIV: A Realm Reborn, live since 2013). The music for XIV was composed by Nobuo Uematsu, who was the lead composer for the first ten main Final Fantasy games and a contributor to the Final Fantasy XI and XII soundtracks. Over the two years that XIV was active, several updates were made to the game, which included additional music composed by Masayoshi Soken, Naoshi Mizuta, Tsuyoshi Sekito and Ryo Yamazaki. XIV was poorly received, and despite the updates, Square Enix decided to take the game offline for a time, and relaunch it with a new development team under a new name. Soken, the sound director for both releases, composed the soundtrack to A Realm Reborn.

Prior to agreeing to create XIVs score, Uematsu had already planned to compose "Kimi ga Iru Kara", the theme song for Final Fantasy XIII. Wanting him to fully focus on XIV, Square Enix asked XIIIs main composer Masashi Hamauzu to write the song instead. Thus, XIII was the first main-series Final Fantasy game soundtrack to not include Uematsu's work. Despite XIV being an MMO and thus a new genre for him, Uematsu treated it as any other video game project. Compared to his previous work within the series, Uematsu had considerable creative freedom while composing the soundtrack, because the rest of the production team did not fully envision beforehand how the soundtrack would sound or fit into the game. Uematsu created a mixture of orchestral and rock pieces for the game's battle themes. There was a momentary crisis when he lost most of the data for his completed tracks and needed to hire a data recovery service. He worked as a freelance composer during the project for Square Enix, also composing the music for The Last Story, a game from Final Fantasy creator Hironobu Sakaguchi. The game's theme song, "Answers", was sung by Susan Calloway. She was chosen by Uematsu, who had worked with her during the first Distant Worlds concert and was impressed by her singing abilities.

For A Realm Reborn, Soken was the primary contributor for numerous original and remixed songs, in addition to reprising his XIV role as lead sound director. The primary goal given to the music team was to make the music true to the series, such as remixed versions of traditional Final Fantasy theme songs including the Final Fantasy theme, Chocobo theme, victory fanfare as well as many others. Naoki Yoshida, the game's producer and director, told Soken to "give [the team] something straightforward that anyone could identify as Final Fantasy, with an easy-to-understand, expressive orchestral sound". Soken focused primarily on creating the soundtrack rather than his sound director role. He often created new tracks due to requests from staff members. As the game was developed and released in a shorter timeframe than the original release, Soken and the sound team were given less than a year to create both the music and the various sound effects for the game world. According to Soken, it felt like "enough work for two full games in that time". Unlike the freedom given Uematsu for XIV, most of the tracks for A Realm Reborn had specific guidelines, though Soken was allowed to "do what [he liked]" for Titan's battle theme. Soken sang the vocal work for some tracks, such as the battle theme for Leviathan. Several themes and tracks from the original game were carried over both directly and as a part of new tracks in A Realm Reborn, including the original vocal theme. Soken also remixed pieces from earlier Final Fantasy games for use in special in-game events.

Original release

Mini-albums

The mini-albums Final Fantasy XIV: Battle Tracks and Final Fantasy XIV: Field Tracks were the first releases of music from the game, and were published by Square Enix on September 29, 2010, a week after the game itself was released. They feature selected tracks from XIV. The music was composed by Uematsu and arranged by Tsutomu Narita. Kenichiro Fukui also helped arrange some of the pieces on the Field Tracks mini-album. Battle Tracks has nine pieces, and includes the game's opening theme, the boss theme "Nail of the Heavens", and Final Fantasy XIVs rendition of Uematsu's "Victory Fanfare". Field Tracks predominantly features the main themes for the game's countries Ul'dah, Gridania and Limsa Lominsa, along with other pieces of music heard during traveling, for a total of eight tracks. Each mini-album was accompanied by special liner notes by Uematsu describing his experiences writing music for the series, with particular reference to the first game.

Patrick Gann of RPGFan termed the mini-albums as a good return work from Uematsu despite some of the unexpected battle tracks, though he questioned whether the discs themselves would be worth purchasing once a full soundtrack album was released. Jayson Napolitano of Original Sound Version was generally positive, and cited the composition of the battle themes as "a cross between The Black Mages and Uematsu's work on Lord of Vermilion". The more orchestral field tracks were also praised. Chris Greening of Square Enix Music Online termed Field Tracks as "largely likeable", and appreciated Uematsu's use of rock music in Battle Tracks, though he disliked the strategy of releasing two incomplete mini-albums rather than a full soundtrack album. Both mini-albums sold well: Battle Tracks appeared at position #73 on the Japanese Oricon album charts for a week, while Field Tracks appeared at position #75 for that same week.

Eorzean Frontiers

Final Fantasy XIV - Eorzean Frontiers was the first full album of music from the game to be released. It was published by Square Enix on September 1, 2012 as a digital album through iTunes. The tracks include most of the music that had been released for the game at that point, including pieces that were present at the game's launch and some which were added later, including "Rise of the White Raven", the theme for Nael Van Darnus, and the themes for the Grand Companies of Eorzea. All of the tracks from the album were additionally released on the same date in a set of smaller digital mini-albums, also released through iTunes, titled Final Fantasy XIV Frontiers - Gridania, Ishgard, Limsa Lominsa, and Ul'dah. The majority of the music was composed by Nobuo Uematsu, with additional pieces contributed by Masayoshi Soken, Naoshi Mizuta, Tsuyoshi Sekito, and Ryo Yamazaki. The 38 tracks of the album cover a duration of 3:14:24.

Derek Heemsbergen of RPGFan reviewed the album as an "incredibly rich and diverse musical score", and felt that regardless of the reception to the game itself, that the soundtrack was worthy of a Final Fantasy game. Jayson Napolitano of Destructoid, in his review of the album, found that while there were many interesting tracks in the album and that the total length of more than three hours made the album a "good deal", that most of the tracks that he enjoyed the most were previously featured on the Final Fantasy XIV Battle Tracks and Field Tracks mini-albums.

Before Meteor

On August 14, 2013, two weeks before the release of A Realm Reborn, Square Enix published Before Meteor: Final Fantasy XIV Original Soundtrack, a full soundtrack album with all of the music composed for the original release of the game, which had shut down a year prior. The 104-track album was released on a single Blu-ray disc and included music lasting 6:05:51, with both the original music by Uematsu as well as the additional tracks composed by Mizuta, Yamazaki, Sekito, Soken, and Ai Yamashita during the game's run. The disc also included a remastered version of the "A New Beginning" trailer and a bonus download code for an in-game Dalamud Minion. The Blu-ray disc allowed purchasers to rip digital copies of the album on their Blu-ray devices to play without the disc. Emily McMillan of Video Game Music Online generally praised the music, praising some of the newer tracks and Uematsu's work on the more orchestral tracks. Her main criticisms were that some aspects seemed artificial and that the composers were playing safe with the themes and motifs used. Before Meteor appeared at position #11 on the Japanese Oricon album charts for its release week and remained in the charts for three weeks.

A Realm Reborn

Original Soundtrack

Final Fantasy XIV: A Realm Reborn Original Soundtrack was released by Square Enix on March 21, 2014. It was released on a Blu-ray disc and features 119 tracks lasting 6:48:00, composed by numerous artists, including Nobuo Uematsu, Masayoshi Soken., Naoshi Mizuta, and Tsuyoshi Sekito. In addition to the tracks present in the initial launch of A Realm Reborn, the album also includes tracks used in the 2.1 patch, A Realm Awoken. Initial copies of the soundtrack also came with a special "Wind-up Bahamut" in-game pet. Soken contributed to composing, compiling, and remixing all of the music of the game, which includes traditional Final Fantasy themes composed originally by Uematsu, as well as sound effects, in only eight months. Emily McMillan of Video Game Music Online, in her review of the album, termed it a "truly fantastic score", and said that it was superior to the music of the original version of the game. She felt that it was an excellent merging of the traditional Final Fantasy musical style with a modern orchestral score. Mike Salbato of RPGFan also praised the album saying that it was his favorite soundtrack album of 2014, and that he "can't recommend A Realm Reborns soundtrack highly enough".

In addition to reviews of the album, within the context of the game the music has been well received. Kotakus Mike Fahey stated that the music was "wonderful, complex and satisfying". He often paused to remove the ambient and interface noises so as to hear it better. GamesRadars Adam Harshberger called it "a standout even amongst Final Fantasys storied heritage" while Digital Spys Mark Langshaw called it "a sonic feast ... that pays appropriate homage to the long-running RPG series". The soundtrack won Video Game Music Onlines 2013 Annual Game Music Awards in the Eastern category. A Realm Reborn appeared at position #10 on the Japanese Oricon album charts for its release week, and remained in the charts for eight weeks, selling over 21,900 copies.

From Astral to Umbral

Final Fantasy XIV: From Astral to Umbral - Band & Piano Arrangement Album is a Blu-ray album of rock and piano arrangements of music from A Realm Reborn. It features arrangements by Soken, GUNN, Keiko, and Nobuko Toda of pieces originally composed by Soken for the game, and was published by Square Enix on December 17, 2014. The first six tracks on the album are piano covers, performed by Keiko, of field and town themes from the game. The following six are rock covers by Soken's band The Primals of the musical themes from the game of the primals, powerful elemental creatures. The Blu-ray disc also features the original versions of the twelve tracks, videos of in-game scenes where the original music plays, as well as one secret track that needs a password to unlock. Some of the original tracks had not yet been released on an official album when Astral to Umbral was produced. In picking tracks to arrange for this album, Soken wanted to highlight the contrast between the two sides. He chose pieces that he originally composed on piano for the piano selections and on guitar for the rock selections.

Mike Salbato of RPGFan reviewed the album and described it as "a great, if perhaps disjointed experience". He praised the high quality of the arrangements and performances, but questioned the grouping of the more gentle piano tracks alongside the heavy rock pieces.

Before the Fall

Before the Fall: Final Fantasy XIV Original Soundtrack is an album of music from four patches to Final Fantasy XIV: A Realm Reborn. These were patches 2.2 through 2.5: "Through the Maelstrom", "Defenders of Eorzea", "Dreams of Ice", and "Before the Fall". The album was released by Square Enix on August 26, 2015 on Blu-ray, and includes all of the music that Soken composed for the updates, as well as several pieces for the updates written by Nobuo Uematsu, Naoshi Mizuta, and Ryo Yamazaki. Of the 61 tracks, 16 were previously released on other albums, primarily the Before Meteor album, and these tracks compose the majority of the non-Soken tracks. It sold around 14,500 copies.

Christopher Huynh of Video Game Music Online held a mixed opinion of the album, which he criticized as "a rather mixed bag of tracks". He said that while some of the tracks were excellent, there were several poor pieces as well, and was disappointed in the repeated material. He ascribed the uneven quality of the album to a lack of an overriding theme to the music, which left it as a collection of disparate material. He also criticized the sound quality, believing that the use of a real orchestra would have helped the orchestral pieces.

Heavensward

Heavensward: Final Fantasy XIV Original Soundtrack is an album of music for the Heavensward expansion pack to A Realm Reborn. The album was released by Square Enix on February 24, 2016 on Blu-ray, and includes all of the music that Soken composed for the expansion and the 3.1 patch "As Goes Light, So Goes Darkness". A few of the 58 tracks on the album were composed by Yukiko Takada or Nobuo Uematsu, and the majority by Soken. Unlike the prior Before the Fall album, all of the music was new to the album, though 16 of the tracks were previously released in September through November 2015 as Final Fantasy XIV: Heavensward -EP- Vol. 1. through 3. It sold over 10,600 copies.

The album was well received by Emily McMillan of Video Game Music Online, who lauded the soundtrack's "brilliant, varied, and extraordinarily fun to hear" themes. She praised the unique atmosphere of the new expansion's music, as well as its integration into the overall game's soundscape. It was also well received by Mike Salbato of RPGFan, who claimed that in the soundtrack, "Uematsu, Soken and co. really got a chance to shine musically". He listed "Dragonsong" and "Heavensward" as the "backbone" of the album, as their themes were prevalent in many other pieces in the soundtrack.

Duality

Final Fantasy XIV: Duality ~Arrangement Album~ is a Blu-ray album of rock and piano arrangements of music from Heavensward. It features arrangements by Soken, GUNN, and Keiko of pieces originally composed by Soken for the game, and was published by Square Enix on December 7, 2016. Like From Astral to Umbral, it is split between piano and rock band covers; the first six tracks are piano covers, performed by Keiko, of field and town themes from the game, while the following seven are rock covers by Soken's band The Primals of the musical themes from the game of the primals. The final track on the album is an acoustic and vocal cover of Oblivion, which was a rock song in the original game.

Mike Salbato of RPGFan reviewed the album and described it in similar terms to From Astral, the first arrangement album for the game. He praised the high quality of the arrangements and performances, but found the piano arrangements more interesting for their originality than the rock arrangements; unlike for the From Astral rock arrangements, many of the Duality arrangements were of rock or rock-inspired tracks, which he felt left the arrangements feeling superfluous. He concluded, however, that the piano arrangements and Oblivion cover made the album an "easy recommendation". Tien Hoang of VGMOnline felt it was inferior to From Astral, however; he described the piano tracks as "fine to listen to", but "not very memorable", and the rock arrangements as enjoyable but predictable and lacking the novelty of the first arranged album.

The Far Edge of Fate

A soundtrack album composed of songs from Patch 3.2 through Patch 3.5, was released on 7 June 2017. It sold over 8,900 copies. Tien Hoang of VGMOnline reviewed the album and felt it contained several "great tracks", but was also repetitive.

Orchestral albums
An album of orchestral arrangements from A Realm Reborn and Heavensward, Final Fantasy XIV Orchestral Arrangement Album, was released on September 20, 2017. Performed by the Tokyo Philharmonic Orchestra, the eight-track album includes arrangements from Sachiko Miyano, Yoshitaka Suzuki, Kenichi Kuroda, Takahiro Tsuji, and Shota Nakama. An expanded eighteen-track album was released on blu-ray on December 20, 2017, as Eorzean Symphony: Final Fantasy XIV Orchestral Album in two versions, one containing studio recordings and one containing live concert recordings. Only two tracks are not included in the original Orchestral Arrangement Album or are from the game itself with minor changes. Tien Hoang of VGMOnline reviewed both albums; they felt that both albums included a solid set of arrangements and performances, though none were particularly innovative or creative.

The Primals
The Primals, an album of rock arrangements by the eponymous band created by composer Masayoshi Soken, was released on May 16, 2018. It monstly contains arrangements that were included in the From Astral to Umbral and Duality albums, with some additional tracks from the Heavensward patches. Tien Hoang of VGMOnline reviewed the album, and found that the tracks worked better together on a dedicated album then they had alongside other arrangement styles in their original albums.

Stormblood

A soundtrack album composed of songs from the Stormblood expansion, covering Patch 4.0 through Patch 4.3, was released on July 4, 2018. The 105-track blu-ray album was reviewed by Tien Hoang of VGMOnline, who highly praised the album's quality and emotional impact, though they felt the breadth of references to prior games' music left the album less focused than the album for the Heavensward expansion.

Piano

An album of piano arrangements, Piano Collections Final Fantasy XIV, was released on March 6, 2019. The 17-track album includes piano renditions of songs from throughout the game's soundtrack. It was reviewed by Tien Hoang of VGMOnline, who found it enjoyable and felt the arrangements new to the album were superior to the inconsequential arrangements of From Astral to Umbral or "improvisational" arrangements from Duality.

Journeys
Journeys: Final Fantasy XIV Arrangement Album is an album of arranged songs from the Heavensward and Stormblood expansions, split between piano and rock arrangements and released on June 19, 2019. Several of the eighteen tracks were prveiously included in The Primals and the Final Fantasy XIV Piano Collections albums. In Tien Hoang of VGMOnline's review, he termed it the best of the piano/rock arrangement albums released to date, with creative arrangements of solid pieces.

Shadowbringers

An album composed of songs from Patch 4.4 through Patch 5.05, covering the Shadowbringers expansion, was released on September 11, 2019.

Pulse
An album of electronic remixes of Final Fantasy XIV tracks, Pulse: Final Fantasy XIV Remix Album, was released on September 30, 2020. The fourteen-track album contains remixes by Takafumi Imamura, Daiki Ishikawa, and Masayoshi Soken, covering songs from A Realm Reborn and the Heavensward, Stormblood, and Shadowbringers expansions. It was reviewed by Tien Hoang of VGMOnline, who found it "solid and entertaining" and one of the more successful arrangement projects of the game's music.

Death Unto Dawn

Another album, composed of songs from Patch 5.1 through 5.55, was released on September 15, 2021.

Legacy
Four tracks from Final Fantasy XIV ("Navigator's Glory", "Twilight Over Thanalan", "Primal Judgement", and an orchestral rendition of "Answers" with vocals by Susan Calloway) were included in the Distant Worlds: Music from Final Fantasy Returning Home concert on November 6 and 7, 2010 in Tokyo, Japan, which was released as a CD-DVD package in 2011. Those four tracks along with "Beneath Bloodied Banners" were then added to the general setlist options for the international Distant Worlds: Music from Final Fantasy concert tour. Tracks from A Realm Reborn were included in the Nintendo 3DS rhythm game Theatrhythm Final Fantasy: Curtain Call. An 88-page book of sheet music for piano arrangements of songs from the soundtrack titled Final Fantasy XIV Piano Solo Sheet Music was published by Dream Music Factory in 2010, containing the tracks featured in the mini-albums. Dream Music Factory also published piano-arranged sheet music for Before Meteor in 2013 titled Before Meteor: Final Fantasy XIV Piano Solo Sheet Music.

A series of concerts of music from Final Fantasy XIV began in 2017, titled Eorzean Symphony. The series began in September 2017 with a three-night set of concerts in Tokyo performed by the Tokyo Philharmonic Orchestra, led by conductor Hirofumi Kurita. It continued in June 2018 with another concert in Los Angeles and in then again in August in Dortmund, Germany. An album was released on December 20, 2017 containing music from the Tokyo concerts; a blu-ray release contains sixteen tracks as well as video from the concerts, while a CD release contains eight tracks. The album sold over 13,100 copies.

References

External links
 Official Square Enix Final Fantasy music site

Final Fantasy music
Video game soundtracks
Video game music discographies
Music